Jana Novotná and Helena Suková were the defending champions, but they participated in this tournament with different partners. Suková played alongside Arantxa Sánchez Vicario, but lost in the semifinals to Novotná and Gigi Fernández. Fernández and Novotná then won the title, defeating Larisa Neiland and Natasha Zvereva in the final 6–4, 6–0.

Seeds

Draw

Finals

Top half

Section 1

Section 2

Bottom half

Section 3

Section 4

References
 Main Draw
1991 French Open – Women's draws and results at the International Tennis Federation

Women's Doubles
French Open - Women's Doubles
French Open by year – Women's doubles
1991 in women's tennis
1991 in French women's sport